The Parnall G.4/31 was a 1930s design from the George Parnall and Company to meet Air Ministry Specification G.4/31 for a "general purpose" aircraft.

Design and development
The Parnall G.4/31 design would be as a replacement for the Westland Wapiti and Fairey Gordon. As such it needed to be usable as a day and night bomber as well as the reconnaissance, torpedo and dive-bombing roles. Designs were offered by Handley Page, Vickers, Fairey and Armstrong Whitworth as well as Parnall.

The G.4/31 was a large angular biplane with fixed spatted wheel spats powered by a 690 hp (515 kW) Bristol Pegasus IM3 with a Townend ring. There was a single forward-firing machine gun for the pilot and a Scarff ring mounted Lewis gun for the observer. Underwing bomb racks on the lower wings and provision to carry a torpedo between the main undercarriage units was also envisioned.

After the prototype was rolled out in 1935, a number of changes were made to the airframe and tail surfaces, when results from wind tunnel testing by the Royal Aeronautical Establishment (R.A.E.) with models revealed problems in spinning. Modifications to the fin, rudder, elevators and rear fuselage were necessary.

Testing
First flying at the Parnall factory in Yate, Bristol, in 1935 with Captain Howard John Saint at the controls, it was not delivered for evaluation by the Aeroplane and Armament Experimental Establishment (A&AEE) at Martlesham Heath until early 1936. The biplane Vickers Type 253 had already been selected to meet the specification and then cancelled when the Ministry saw that Vickers monoplane alternative to the Type 253 was superior and that entered service as the Vickers Wellesley.

The sole Parnall G.4/31 (serial K2772) prototype was used for armament trials by the A&AED until March 1937 when it was damaged in a crash and subsequently scrapped. The G.4/31 was the final military design from the company.

Operators

Aeroplane and Armament Experimental Establishment
Bristol Aeroplane Company

Specifications (G.4/31)

See also
Fairey G.4/31
Handley Page H.P.47

References
Notes

Bibliography

 Lewis, Peter. "Parnall G.4/31." Air Pictorial, Volume 25, No. 9, September 1963.
 Mason, Francis K. The British Bomber since 1914. London:Putnam, 1994. .
 Wixey, Kenneth E. Parnall Aircraft since 1914. Annapolis, MD: Naval Institute Press, 1990. .

External links

MAID-of-all-WORK The New Parnall General-purpose Biplane -pictures in Flight

1930s British bomber aircraft
Single-engined tractor aircraft
Biplanes
Aircraft first flown in 1935
Parnall aircraft